Carl Mahon was an actor in the United States. An African American, he had several film roles including a starring role in the 1932 film The Girl from Chicago

Mahon was born in Trinidad.

He portrayed an Ethiopian in Oscar Micheaux's film The Exile. In Micheaux's film The Girl from Chicago the director's voice is heard telling Mahon the line "Well, you've got to give it to her." which Mahon repeats.

Filmography
The Exile (1931), as Jango
The Girl from Chicago (1932)
Veiled Aristocrats (1932), as Frank Fowler
Ten Minutes to Live (1932), as Anthony

Theater
Porgy (play)

References

20th-century American male actors
Year of birth missing
Trinidad and Tobago emigrants to the United States
Trinidad and Tobago male actors
African-American male actors